The 2020 MTN 8 was the 46th edition of South Africa's annual soccer cup competition, the MTN 8. It featured the top eight teams of the Premier Soccer League at the end of the 2019–20 season.

Supersport United were defending champions, but were eliminated in the Semifinal by Bloemfontein Celtic.

The competition was won by Orlando Pirates, ending a six-year trophy drought.

Teams
The eight teams competing in the MTN 8 knockout competition are (listed according to their finishing position in the 2019/2020 Premier Soccer League Season):
 Mamelodi Sundowns
 Kaizer Chiefs
 Orlando Pirates
 Tshakhuma Tsha Madzivhandila (purchased the position from Bidvest Wits)
 SuperSport United
 Cape Town City
 Maritzburg
 Bloemfontein Celtic

Quarter-finals

Semi-finals

 

Bloemfontein Celtic won 2–1 on aggregate

Orlando Pirates won 5–0 on aggregate

Final

Luthuli scores his goal after a corner kick for Bloemfontein Celtic in the 4th minute. Orlando Pirates player Thabang Monare received an injury and was replaced by Thembinkosi lorch. In the 32nd minutes, Hotto levels the matter for Orlando Pirates and the score was 1–1. After half time Thembinkosi lorch was fouled in the box and the referee called for a penalty in which was taken by lorch and made it 2–1 for Pirates scoring his second goal in the competition. The match ended in 2–1 and Pirates took the trophy ending their six-year trophy drought.

Statistics

References

MTN 8
2020–21 in South African soccer
2020 domestic association football cups